Careiro da Várzea is a municipality located in the Brazilian state of Amazonas. Its population was 30,846 (2020) and its area is 2,631 km².  It lies on the south (right) bank of the Amazon opposite Manaus.

Careiro da Várzea is the terminus of the BR-319 road from southern Brazil.  There is a ferry link to Manaus.

References

Municipalities in Amazonas (Brazilian state)
Populated places on the Amazon